Victorious Zawedde is a Ugandan politician and member of the Parliament.  She was elected in office as a woman Member to represent Nakasongola district located in the Central region of Uganda during the 2021 Uganda general elections.

She is contested as an independent candidate.

See also
 List of members of the eleventh Parliament of Uganda
 Nakasongola District
 Parliament of Uganda
 Member of Parliament

References

Women members of the Parliament of Uganda
21st-century Ugandan women politicians
21st-century Ugandan politicians
Members of the Parliament of Uganda
Living people
Year of birth missing (living people)